This is a list of songs recorded by the Belgian musician Stromae. He has recorded two studio albums, two mixtape's, one extended play, one video album and one compilation album (over 50 songs).

Released songs

Unreleased songs

Notes

References

Stromae